Congo-Kinshasa competed at the 1968 Summer Olympics in Mexico City, Mexico.  It was the first time that the nation was represented at the Olympic Games. Five competitors, all men, took part in two events in the cycling.

Cycling

Individual road race
 Jean Barnabe
 Constantin Kabemba
 Samuel Kibamba
 Ignace Mandjambi

Team time trial
 Constantin Kabemba
 François Ombanzi
 Jean Barnabe
 Samuel Kibamba

References

External links
 Official Olympic Reports
 

Nations at the 1968 Summer Olympics
1968